Lokmanya Tilak may refer to: 

Lokmanya Tilak (Bal Gangadhar Tilak) (1856-1920), was an Indian nationalist.

Things named for Lokmanya Tilak:
Lokmanya Tilak College of Engineering in Navi Mumbai
Lokmanya Tilak High School, an English medium school located in Tilak Nagar, Chembur in Mumbai
Lokmanya Tilak Municipal General Hospital, a general municipal hospital situated in Sion, Mumbai
Lokmanya Tilak Terminus, a railhead in a suburb of Mumbai
Lokmanya: Ek Yugpurush, a 2015 film by Om Raut
Lokmanya (TV series), a 2022 Marathi TV series
Lokmanya Tilak Terminus–Ernakulam Duronto Express
Lokmanya Tilak College of Engineering
Lokmanya Tilak Terminus–Ajni Express
Lokmanya Tilak Terminus–Darbhanga Pawan Express, Express train
Lokmanya Tilak Terminus–Karimnagar Express
Lokmanya Tilak Municipal Medical College and General Hospital, Government medical college and hospital
Lokmanya Tilak Terminus–Hazrat Nizamuddin AC Express
Lokmanya Tilak Terminus–Karaikal Weekly Express
Lokmanya Tilak Terminus–Azamgarh Weekly Express
Lokmanya Tilak Terminus–Haridwar AC Superfast Express
Lokmanya Tilak Terminus–Secunderabad AC Duronto Express
Lokmanya Tilak Terminus–Allahabad Duronto Express, Indian express train service